Hospitality management may refer to:
Hospitality industry
Hotel manager